Palais Todesco is a Ringstraßenpalais in Vienna, Austria, constructed from 1861 to 1864 on plans by architect Theophil Hansen.

It was built for the aristocratic  family. One of the inhabitants was Baroness Sophie von Todesco, who established a renowned salon for artists and intellectuals.

The palace served as the headquarters of the Austrian People's Party from 1947 to 1995.

External links
AEIOU | Palais Todesco

Todesco
Theophil Hansen buildings
1864 establishments in the Austrian Empire
19th-century architecture in Austria